Ell & Nikki, also known as Eldar & Nigar, are an Azerbaijani pop duo consisting of singers Eldar Gasimov and Nigar Jamal. On 14 May 2011 they won the Eurovision Song Contest 2011 for Azerbaijan with their entry "Running Scared". It was the country's first win at the contest. Although Nigar Jamal represented Azerbaijan, she lives in Enfield, North London.

Band history

National final constellation
Eldar and Nigar separately took part in the Azerbaijani national selection, Milli Seçim Turu 2011. They qualified from the semi-finals along with three other artists to the final on 11 February 2011, where they won the right to represent Azerbaijan at the Eurovision Song Contest 2011 in Düsseldorf, Germany in May 2011. Although it was originally planned to send an individual as Azerbaijan, when the winner was announced, İTV had decided that both Eldar and Nigar would be going to Germany as a duo.

Eurovision win

In the 2011 Eurovision song contest Eldar Gasimov and Nigar Jamal performed together under the duo name Ell & Nikki. As the contest was taking place in a Western European country, the name change was made to prevent confusion of Jamal's first name being interpreted as a racial slur. Their entry, named "Running Scared", was written by Stefan Örn and Sandra Bjurman from Sweden and Iain Farquharson from the UK. The performance included four backing vocalists and singers, including Jessica Marberger and Vera Prada who had earlier in the year attempted to represent Sweden as part of Shirley's Angels.

They were the overall winners of the Eurovision final on 14 May, which meant that Azerbaijan earned the right to host the Eurovision Song Contest 2012.

2011–present: After Eurovision

Since winning the Eurovision final 2011, Jamal and Gasimov travelled to many European countries to perform their winning entry in the contest. The singers also received "Peace and Friendship Award" in Zonguldak’s Ereğli district for carrying a Turkish flag onstage during final scene. Azerbaijan issued a postage stamp dedicated to Azerbaijan’s victory with Gasimov and Jamal at Eurovision.

In 2011, Ell and Nikki became the official faces of Nar Mobile, one of Azerbaijan's mobile communication providers.

In 2013, the duo recorded their second song named Music's Still Alive. The song was written as a tribute to Michael Jackson and released on 29 August 2013, the late singer's birthday. Both Gasimov and Jamal describe themselves as Jackson fans.
They were announced as the spokespersons for Azerbaijan at the final of Eurovision Song Contest 2021, reading out the country's jury points.

Discography

Singles

References

External links

 Official website
 Running Scared: Eurovision 2011 Winning Song

Pop music duos
Eurovision Song Contest entrants for Azerbaijan
Eurovision Song Contest entrants of 2011
Eurovision Song Contest winners
Azerbaijani pop music groups
Male–female musical duos